Fayez al-Khoury (Arabic: فائز الخوري) (1959 - 1885), was a Syrian politician who served as foreign minister for term term in 1940s. He also served twice as Minister of Finance.

Background 
He was born to a Christian family from the village of Kefir. He came with his older brother Faris al-Khoury to Damascus and then went to study law at the American University of Beirut, and then to the Institute of Law in Istanbul.

Career 
He joined the National coalition in 1928 and served as foreign minister for term term in 1940s. Also he was appointed the ambassador of Syria in Washington, D.C., London, and Moscow

References 

Foreign ministers of Syria
Syrian ministers of finance
Syrian politicians
20th-century Syrian politicians
Syrian Christians
Al-Khoury family
1885 births
1959 deaths